Lahn may refer to:

the Lahn, a river in western Germany
Lahn, Hesse, a city that existed between 1977 and 1979 as a merger of Wetzlar and Gießen, in Hesse, Germany
Lahn, Lower Saxony, a municipality in the district of Emsland, Lower Saxony
Lahn (Wald im Pinzgau), a village in the municipality Wald im Pinzgau, Austria
Lähn, German name of the town Wleń in Poland